Trần Cảo (chữ Hán: 陳暠, ?–1428) was briefly king of Vietnam 1426–1428. He was installed by Le Loi under the terms of a Ming dynasty Chinese withdrawal which promised to withdraw if a Trần dynasty descendant was placed on the throne. However, after Le Loi intercepted a Chinese general's requests for reinforcements he resumed the war, defeated the Chinese and made Trần Cảo drink poison.

References

Trần dynasty
1428 deaths
Year of birth unknown
Vietnamese monarchs